The Piper PA-16 Clipper is an extended fuselage model of the PA-15 Vagabond. Both models were designed in 1947 for the same reason – Piper Aircraft found itself in dire financial straits and needed to create new, competitive models using existing parts and tooling. The result was the Vagabond, essentially a side-by-side version of the tandem J-3 Cub credited with saving the company.

Design and development
The PA-16 Clipper is a stretched and refined version of the Vagabond intended to seat four people (or "two-and-a-half to three" as often told by Clipper pilots). It is equipped with an extra wing tank, added doors to accommodate the new seating, and a Lycoming O-235, the same engine that would later power the Cessna 152. The PA-16 Clipper retained the control sticks that had up to that point been common in aircraft derived from the "Cub" family.

In 1949, the Clipper sold for $2995. The average four-place airplane on the market at that time cost over $5000.  Only 736 Clippers were built in the one year of production before Piper changed to the Piper PA-20 Pacer.

Pan Am Airlines, which traditionally called its famous luxury airliners "Clippers", took offense at Piper using the name for its light aircraft. As a result of this pressure Piper further refined the model, adding wing flaps, further fuel tanks and replaced the control sticks with yokes. A more powerful Lycoming O-290 125 hp engine was installed and this model became the Piper PA-20 Pacer.

Operational history
Despite the low number of aircraft built, according to the Federal Aviation Administration, in April 2018 there were still 303 examples in service in the United States.

Specifications (PA-16)

See also

References
Notes

Bibliography
Piper's Golden Age by Alan Abel, Drina Welch Abel, and Paul Matt
The Pilot's Guide to Affordable Classics by Bill Clarke

External links

1940s United States sport aircraft
High-wing aircraft
Single-engined tractor aircraft
Clipper
Aircraft first flown in 1947